Jasrado Prince Hermis Arrington "Jazz" Chisholm Jr. (born February 1, 1998) is a Bahamian professional baseball second baseman and center fielder for the Miami Marlins of Major League Baseball (MLB) and Great Britain national baseball team.

Early life
Chisholm was drawn to baseball by his grandmother, Patricia Coakley, who played shortstop for the Bahamian national softball team; she taught him to hit at two years old. Chisholm moved to the United States at 12 years old to attend high school at Life Prep Academy in Wichita, Kansas. He played basketball and football in addition to baseball at Life Prep. After high school, he returned to the Bahamas to train at a sports academy.

Career

Arizona Diamondbacks
Chisholm signed with the Arizona Diamondbacks as an international free agent in July 2015 for $200,000. He made his professional debut in 2016 with the Missoula Osprey and spent the season there, batting .281 with nine home runs and 37 RBIs along with 13 stolen bases in 62 games. Chisholm spent 2017 with the Kane County Cougars, but was limited due to injury. In 29 games for Kane County he posted a .248 average with a home run and 12 RBIs. He began 2018 with Kane County and was promoted to the Visalia Rawhide in July. In 112 games between both teams, he batted .272 with 25 home runs and 70 RBIs. Chisholm began 2019 with the Jackson Generals.

Miami Marlins
On July 31, 2019, the Diamondbacks traded Chisholm to the Marlins for Zac Gallen. He was assigned to the Jacksonville Jumbo Shrimp, with whom he finished the year. Over 112 games between Jackson and Jacksonville, Chisholm slashed .220/.321/.441 with 21 home runs, 54 RBIs, and 16 stolen bases.

Chisholm was added to the Marlins' 40-man roster following the 2019 season.

Chisholm was promoted to the major leagues for the first time on September 1, 2020, and made his defensive debut that night against the Toronto Blue Jays. Chisholm's first at-bat was in the following game against Toronto on September 2, 2020. On September 6, Chisholm recorded his first career hit at the major league level, while facing the Tampa Bay Rays. Three days later, Chisholm hit his first career major league home run against the Atlanta Braves.

In 2021, Chisholm made the Marlins out of spring training as the team's starting second baseman. In 2021, he hit .248/.303/.425 with 18 home runs, 53 RBIs and 23 stolen bases. He had the fastest sprint speed of all major league second basemen, at 29.1 feet/second.

By mid-season 2022, Chisholm was hitting for a .254 batting average, alongside 14 home runs, 45 runs batted in, 39 runs scored, 12 stolen bases, and an on base plus slugging percentage of .860. He was the National League leader at his position in OPS, home runs and RBI, as well as slugging percentage (.535) and triples (4). Chisholm made the All Star Game for the first time in his career, being named the starting second baseman for the National League. He became the first Bahamian-born player to make the All-Star Game roster. He did not play in the game, as he was placed on the injured list on June 29, due to what was then diagnosed as right lower back strain. On July 22, the Marlins stated that Chisholm had a stress reaction in his lower back, and would miss at least six weeks of the season. On September 10, it was confirmed that Chisholm would be out for the rest of the season. In 60 games that season, he hit .254/.325/.535 with 14 home runs, 10 doubles, 4 triples, 45 RBI and 12 stolen bases. 

Chisholm was confirmed to be moving to the outfield to play centerfield in the 2023 season after Luis Arráez was traded to the team on January 20, 2023.

International career
As a Bahamian, Chisholm is eligible to represent both the Bahamas and Great Britain in international competition, considering the Bahamas status as a former British colony and member of the British Commonwealth. He represented the Great Britain national baseball team in the 2017 World Baseball Classic qualification. He did not join the team in the qualifiers for the 2023 edition in Regensburg, Germany, due to taking place during the 2022 MLB season. However, upon Great Britain's qualification on Sept. 20, he announced that he would again play for Great Britain in the 2023 World Baseball Classic. However, the Marlins did not allow this to take place.

Personal life
Chisholm is the cover athlete of MLB The Show 23, and the first Marlins player to be featured as the cover star.

References

External links

1998 births
Living people
Bahamian expatriate baseball players in the United States
Criollos de Caguas players
Expatriate baseball players in Puerto Rico
Great Britain national baseball team players
Jackson Generals (Southern League) players
Jacksonville Jumbo Shrimp players
Kane County Cougars players
Liga de Béisbol Profesional Roberto Clemente infielders
Major League Baseball players from the Bahamas
Major League Baseball shortstops
Miami Marlins players
Missoula Osprey players
Great Britain
National League All-Stars
Salt River Rafters players
Sportspeople from Nassau, Bahamas
Visalia Rawhide players